Maya Gnyp is an Emmy nominated film producer. She has produced the documentaries, Shelter, an episode of the HBO Max and Sesame Workshop series "Through Our Eyes", Mystify: Michael Hutchence, Finding the Field, Ecco Homo, In Bob We Trust, and Autoluminescent: Rowland S. Howard. Shelter has won the Audience Award at the 2021 AFI DOCS Film Festival and the 2022 Directors Guild of America Award for Outstanding Children's Program, it was nominated for the 2022 NAACP Image Award for Outstanding Short Form Series or Special, and is currently nominated for the 2022 Humanitas Prize (Best Documentary), and the 2022 News and Documentary Emmy Award for Outstanding Short Documentary.

Maya was educated at The University of Melbourne, Victoria, The University of California at Berkeley, and at IE Business School. She lives and works between Los Angeles, California and Melbourne, Victoria.

[1] 

[2] 

Australian film producers
Living people
Year of birth missing (living people)